Rev. William Cassady Cattell D.D., LL.D (August 30, 1827 – February 11, 1898) was a Presbyterian divine and educator of the United States, serving as the 7th president of Lafayette College.

Early life
William Cassady Cattell was born in Salem, New Jersey, on August 30, 1827, to Thomas and Keziah Cattell, a merchant and banker respectively. He had five brothers and two sisters, one of his brothers, Alexander G. Cattell, later served as a New Jersey state senator.

Cattell started his schooling in his native town of Salem before studying for two years in Virginia under the care of his older brother, Thomas (who would later become a professor at Lincoln University). He returned to New Jersey, attending The College of New Jersey (now Princeton University), graduating with high honors in 1848. He returned to Princeton the following year to attend the Princeton Theological Seminary where he graduated in 1852. Following his graduation he spent an extra year at the seminary to take further part in Oriental Studies under professor Joseph Addison Alexander.

Career
Cattell's first job was as the associate principal at the Edgehill Preparatory School located in Princeton, New Jersey. He stayed there for two years before accepting a position teaching Latin and Greek at nearby Lafayette College in Easton, Pennsylvania, in 1855. Here, Cattell taught for five years before resigning to become a pastor at the Pine Street Presbyterian Church in Harrisburg, Pennsylvania, in 1860.

Lafayette College
With the onset of the American Civil War, Lafayette College saw a drastic reduction in its student population, and therefore struggled financially to stay afloat. In 1863, nearing bankruptcy, the college's board of trustees reached out to Cattell, then practicing in Harrisburg, asking him to return to the school in an effort to save it from economic ruin. Cattell accepted the call later that year and was officially inaugurated as the college's seventh president in July, 1864.

Cattell's main role as president was to secure an endowment and find monies to keep the college solvent. In 1864, less than a year after his inauguration, Cattell secured a $20,000 gift (equivalent to $ in  dollars), from coal magnate Ario Pardee, which lead the charge for more donations to bring the college's assets from $40,000 to almost $900,000. Cattell later took a sabbatical with Pardee's son, Ario Pardee Jr. in Europe to learn the practices of their institutions and bring back some of their knowledge to implement at Lafayette.

During his time as president, Cattell also taught courses in Mental and Moral Philosophy, and instituted a series of courses centered around the Bible. He also took on responsibility for the campus's literary and social clubs, as well as its religious obligations. These extra tasks, alongside the presidency, took a toll on Cattell, who retired in 1883 having served as the president for twenty years.

Retirement
During Cattell's retirement, he continued to travel to Europe, familiarizing himself with the Presbyterian Church in Europe. In 1884 he became the Secretary of the Board of Ministerial Relief of the Presbyterian Church, which led him to travel the country raising money for widows, orphans, and other suffering individuals. In his time on this board he helped raise over three million dollars.

Other accomplishments
In 1864, Cattell received the honorary degree of Doctor of Divinity from both Hanover College and Princeton University. In 1878 he received the honorary degree of Legum Doctor from Wooster University. He was also made a director of the Princeton Theological Seminary in 1864, and the president of the Presbyterian History Society in 1890. Cattell Street, located in Easton, Pennsylvania, was named after him as well. He was elected as a member to the American Philosophical Society in 1871.

Personal life
Cattell married Elizabeth McKeen, the daughter of Lafayette College board of trustees member James McKeen. Together they had two sons, Henry Ware Cattell, and James McKeen Cattell, the first professor of psychology at the University of Pennsylvania, and later a professor at Columbia University.

Death
Cattell died on February 11, 1898, at his home in Philadelphia, due to complications stemming from heart conditions.

References

External links
 
 

1827 births
1898 deaths
American Presbyterians
People from Salem, New Jersey
Princeton University alumni
Princeton Theological Seminary alumni
Presidents of Lafayette College
Lafayette College faculty
Lafayette College trustees